Kuradisild (Devil's Bridge; originally Aleksandri sild, German: Alexander Brücke, Alexander's Bridge) is a dark concrete bridge located on Toomemägi in Tartu, Estonia, built to commemorate the 300th anniversary of the Romanov Dynasty in 1913.

Kuradisild is one of the few remaining concrete bridges built in early 20th century. It is one of the symbols and landmarks of Tartu alongside Inglisild (Angel's Bridge) located on the other side of Toome Hill. The elegant bridge is supported by two arches. The massive parapet is decorated with ornamental panels and seating recesses.

The first bridge located in the place now occupied by Kuradisild was built in 1809. The Neogothic wooden bridge was based on designs by the University of Tartu architect Johann Wilhelm Krause. This bridge was later replaced by a single span wooden bridge designed by J. G. Köningsmann and built in 1842–1844. The current single span concrete bridge was built to commemorate the 300th anniversary of the Romanov dynasty after designs made by Tartu city architect Arved Eichhorn. The Toome Hill side of the bridge is decorated with the numbers 1613 and 1913, commemorating the jubilee; the Toome Valley side of the bridge bears a bronze relief of Alexander I of Russia (made by Constanze von Wetter-Rosenthal) and the words "Alexandro Primo".

The bridge is a protected heritage site.

Origin of the name 
The origin of the name of the Devil's Bridge is unclear. The name may have derived from the dark color of the bridge which stands in sharp contrast with the nearby, much lighter, Angel's Bridge. It has also been suggested that the name may have originated from the name of the supervisor of the construction of the bridge, Professor of Medicine and surgeon Werner Zoege von Manteuffel ("Teufel" – the German for "Devil"), from its similarity to the Teufelsbrücke on Reuss.

References 

Bridges in Tartu